Bindo Lanong is an Indian politician. He has been elected twice to the Meghalaya Legislative Assembly from Malki-Nongthymmai once in 1983 and in 2008 as a member of the United Democratic Party. He was sworn as Minister of State for Labour, Environment, Relief, and Rehabilitation, Earthquake Rehabilitation in Mukul Sangma cabinet in June 2019.

He was elected as Speaker of Meghalaya Legislative Assembly from March 2008 to May 2009 and was Deputy Chief Minister of Meghalaya from April 2010 to March 2013

References

Living people
State cabinet ministers of Meghalaya
Deputy chief ministers of Meghalaya
People from Talegaon
1976 births
Meghalaya MLAs 1983–1988
United Democratic Party (Meghalaya) politicians
Speakers of the Meghalaya Legislative Assembly
Meghalaya MLAs 2008–2013